is a Japanese footballer who plays for Roasso Kumamoto.

Career
After playing for the football team of Chuo University, Sakamoto signed for Roasso Kumamoto in December 2017.

Club statistics
Updated to 28 August 2018.

References

External links
Profile at J. League
Profile at Roasso Kumamoto

1995 births
Living people
Ryutsu Keizai University alumni
Association football people from Chiba Prefecture
Japanese footballers
J2 League players
Roasso Kumamoto players
Association football midfielders